The Prosecutor-General of Sweden is the department head for the Swedish Prosecution Authority responsible for the daily operations, the highest-ranked prosecutor in the country, and the only public prosecutor in the Supreme Court. The Office of the Prosecutor-General is responsible for legal development, the agency's operations in the Supreme Court, and administrative tasks. The Legal Department of the Prosecutor-General has an overall responsibility for the operations in the Supreme Court and key international issues. The office was established in 1948, when the Chancellor of Justice's task as chief prosecutor was transferred to the Prosecutor-General.

The Prosecutor-General is organized under the Ministry of Justice and appointed by the Government, though without belonging to the spoils system, and can only be dismissed under special circumstances described in the Letters Patent Act, with support from the Swedish National Disciplinary Offence Board.

List of Prosecutors-General
There have been eight Prosecutors-General in Sweden, since the office was created in 1948.

 Maths Heuman, 1948–1960
 Emanuel Walberg, 1960–1966
 Holger Romander, 1966–1978
 Magnus Sjöberg, 1978–1989
 Torsten Jonsson, 1989–1994
 Klas Bergenstrand, 1994–2004
 Fredrik Wersäll, 2004–2008
 Anders Perklev, 2008–2018
 Petra Lundh, 2018–

See also
 Supreme Court of Sweden
 Crime in Sweden

References

Heads of Swedish State agencies
1948 establishments in Sweden
Legal professions
Law enforcement agencies of Sweden